The 1957 Bandy World Championship was contested among three men's bandy playing nations and was the first ever Bandy World Championship. Norway declined to take part due to the Soviet invasion of Hungary in November 1956.

The championship was played in Finland from 28 February to 3 March 1957, as part of the fifty year anniversary celebrations for the Ball Association of Finland, which at the time was the governing body for bandy in Finland. The tournament was officially opened by President of the republic Urho Kekkonen. All games, which were only three, were played at the Helsinki Olympic Stadium. The Soviet Union became champions.

Participants

Premier tour
 28 February
 Finland – Sweden 4–3 (Timoska (2), Aho (2) - Vikner, Vikman, Fredblad)
 2 March
 Soviet Union – Sweden 2–2 (Papugin, Atamanychev - Janson, Saav)
 3 March
 Soviet Union – Finland 6–1 (Atamanychev (2), Vodyanov, Papugin (2), Shunin - Aho)

References

1957
World Championship
Bandy World Championship
International bandy competitions hosted by Finland
Bandy World Championship
Bandy World Championship
International sports boycotts